Sibulaküla (Estonian for "Onion Village") is a subdistrict in the district of Kesklinn (Midtown), Tallinn, the capital of Estonia. It has a population of 2,120.

Gallery

References

Subdistricts of Tallinn
Kesklinn, Tallinn